was a Japanese architect, forming what is now widely known as the "Shinohara School", which has been linked to the works of Toyo Ito, Kazunari Sakamoto and Itsuko Hasegawa. As architectural critic Thomas Daniell put it, "A key figure who explicitly rejected Western influences yet appears on almost every branch of the family tree of contemporary Japanese architecture... is Kazuo Shinohara... His effects on the discipline as a theorist, designer and teacher have been immense." He studied at Tokyo Institute of Technology, (TIT) finishing in 1953, and going on to become professor in 1970. He established his own practice in 1954, going on to design more than 30 residential buildings, as well as many key public buildings across Japan.

His work is generally classified as having strong qualities of lucidity and ephemerality, and for these reasons is often seen as ideologically influential on Toyo Ito's work.

He was awarded the Architectural Institute of Japan's (AIJ) grand prize in 2005. In 2010 the Biennale di Venezia awarded a special commemorative Golden Lion in memory of Kazuo Shinohara.

List of selected works 

 Kugayama House (1954)
 Umbrella House (1961)
 House with an Earthen Floor (1963)
 North House in Hanayama (1965) 
 House in White (1966)
 House of Earth (1966)
 Uncompleted House (1970)
 Prism House (1974)
 Tanikawa House (1974)
 Uehara House (1976)
 House Under High Voltage Lines (1981)
 House in Yokohama (1985)
 Japan Ukiyo-e Museum in Matsumoto (1982)
 Tokyo Institute of Technology (TIT) Centennial Hall; Tokyo (1987)
 Kumamoto Police Station (1990)
 K2 Building; Osaka (1990)

Bibliography

Exhibitions
 2010: Les Rencontres d'Arles festival, France.

References

External links 

 Article on "The Intrinsic Structure of Shinohara's Work"
  Architectural Record's obituary of Shinohara
 Publication: "A Street with Human Shadows"
 Article on "The Influence of Milieu in the Residential Architecture of Shinohara Kazuo"
 Excerpt of the 2G monograph n. 58/59 "Kazuo Shinohara: Casas/Houses", Enric Massip-Bosch, David B. Stewart, Shin-Ichi Okuyama. Barcelona: Gustavo Gili, 2011
 Conversation between Kazuo Shinohara and Hans Ulrich Obrist published in Quaderns d'Arquitectura, n. 265, Barcelona 04.2014

Japanese architects
1925 births
2006 deaths
Academic staff of Tokyo Institute of Technology
Tokyo Institute of Technology alumni
Recipients of the Medal with Purple Ribbon